Floridanos is a term for colonial residents of Spanish Florida, as well as for the modern descendants of the earliest Spanish settlers who lived in St. Augustine between 1565 and 1763. It also refers to those of Spanish descent who lived in East and West Florida after 1781, when Bernardo de Gálvez took back Mobile and Pensacola in West Florida from British hands. Some Floridanos can trace their ancestry in Florida back twelve or more generations. Descendants of the original Floridanos can be found throughout the state, especially in St. Augustine.

History

Established on September 8, 1565, St. Augustine is the oldest continuously inhabited European settlement in what is now the United States. Following Spain's defeat in the Seven Years' War, Spain ceded Florida to Great  Britain in 1763. Some of St. Augustine's Spanish settlers left Florida during the period that British ruled East Florida, with many of them moving to Cuba. Approximately 3,000 Floridanos left Florida for Havana, Cuba between 1763 and early 1764. Spanish Floridians in west Florida mostly fled to Veracruz, Mexico, with about 620 sailing from Pensacola. The term "Floridano" was the term used by the Spanish colonial authorities to designate Spanish Floridian immigrants to Cuba. Spain recovered East Florida and gained control of West Florida through the Peace of Paris of 1783. The governors of the provinces of East and West Florida promoted Spanish migration to them. Florida was ceded to the United States in 1819 by the Adams–Onís Treaty. As happened in 1763, many Floridanos migrated to Cuba.

In 2010, an historical marker titled "Los Floridanos" that commemorates the Floridanos was unveiled at St. Augustine's Visitor Information Center.

Demographics 
The number of descendants of Spanish settlers in Florida is unknown. However, two of the earliest settlers, Francisco Sanchez and Manuel Solana, are known to have between 500 and 1,000 descendants living in the state. Manuel Solana was a descendant of Alonso Solana who had arrived to Florida in 1613 as a soldier in the Spanish military. These settlers were some of the few Spaniards who remained in Florida when the territory was ceded to Great Britain  in 1763. Their descendants founded the Los Floridanos Society in St. Augustine, whose main function is to teach the history and legacy of the first settlers (1565-1765) to interested people. Some people of Cuban origin living in Florida also have ancestors in Colonial Florida. Some of the descendants of East Florida Governor José María Coppinger, who was not a settler of Florida and lived in Cuba his last years, also live in Florida.

Notable Floridanos 
 Joseph Marion Hernández (1788 - 1857), Floridano who served as the first delegate from the Florida Territory. He was also the first Hispanic American to serve in the United States Congress and a member of the Whig Party (1822 - 1823)
 Eligio de la Puente (1724–1781),  Floridano who held various public offices in St. Augustine, Florida and in Havana, Cuba during the 18th century.
 Agustín V. Zamorano (1798–1842), Floridano who served as governor of Alta California (1832 - 1833).

See also
 Spanish Florida
 East Florida
 West Florida
 List of colonial governors of Florida
Hispanos
 Californios
 Nuevomexicanos
 Tejanos
Isleños
 Isleños (Louisiana)
Hispanics
Spanish Americans

References

External links
Los Floridanos Society, Inc.

Cuban-American culture in Florida
Spanish-American culture in Florida
Spanish Florida
Spanish-Cuban culture
Spanish-Mexican culture